Post-amendment to the Tamil Nadu Entertainments Tax Act 1939 on 1 April 1958, Gross jumped to 140 per cent of Nett Commercial Taxes Department disclosed 4.41 crore in entertainment tax revenue for the year.

The following is a list of films produced in the Tamil film industry in India in 1964, in alphabetical order.

1964

References

Films, Tamil
Lists of 1964 films by country or language
1964
1960s Tamil-language films